The thickspine roughy (Hoplostethus robustispinus) is a slimehead of the order Beryciformes. It can reach sizes of up to  SL.

References

Hoplostethus
Fish described in 2010
Fish of the Pacific Ocean